Phytoecia cinctipennis is a species of beetle in the family Cerambycidae. It was described by Mannerheim in 1849. It is known from Russia, Mongolia, China, and South Korea.

Subspecies
 Phytoecia cinctipennis coreensis Breuning, 1955
 Phytoecia cinctipennis cinctipennis Mannerheim, 1849

References

Phytoecia
Beetles described in 1849